Zeblon Zenzele Vilakazi  (born 3 April 1969) has been Vice Chancellor of the Wits University in Johannesburg, South Africa since 1 January 2021. Professor Vilakazi is a nuclear physicist. Prior to his promotion, he was Vice-Principal and Deputy Vice-Chancellor for Research and Postgraduate Studies. He speaks French, German, Russian, Xhosa, Zulu, Siswati (Mother tongue), Sesotho, Afrikaans and English.

Early life 
Vilakazi was born in Katlehong, Ekurhuleni, as the youngest of a family of eight. His mother was a housewife, and his father ran a small shop in the community. He was one of the first students from Africa to conduct PhD research at the European Centre for Nuclear Research (CERN) in Geneva, Switzerland. This was followed by a National Research Foundation postdoctoral fellowship at CERN.

Career 
After conducting his doctoral research at the European Centre for Nuclear Research (CERN) in Geneva, Switzerland, he returned to South Africa and became a lecturer at the University of Cape Town, where he was instrumental in establishing South Africa’s first experimental high-energy physics research group focusing on the development of the High-level Trigger for the CERN-ALICE experiment at the Large Hadron Collider. He joined the University of the Witwatersrand in January 2014 as the Deputy Vice-Chancellor: Research and Postgraduate Affairs and was promoted to the position of Vice-Principal in April 2020. He is a Fellow of the African Academy of Sciences. He was elected a Fellow of the Royal Society (FRS) in May 2022.

References 

1969 births
Living people
Nuclear physicists
Vice-Chancellors of the University of the Witwatersrand
Fellows of the Royal Society
Fellows of the African Academy of Sciences